The Greek Orthodox Church of St. George is a church in the suburb of Mile End, in the South Australian capital of Adelaide. It is under the auspices of the Greek Orthodox Archdiocese of Australia and spiritual direction of Archbishop Makarios of Australia and is the largest Greek Orthodox church in Adelaide. This is partly due to the high population of Greek Australians in the area, mostly from Thebarton, Torrensville and Mile End.



Greeks of North-East West Torrens

Throughout the 1950s the area became home to a large number of Greek migrants, and by 1966 they formed 13.4 per cent of the population in Thebarton.

The "Greek Orthodox Community and Parish of Saint George Thebarton and Western Suburbs Inc." was formed in 1960 to help the expatriate Greeks, and in 1965 the members of that community built St. George's church.

Today, the suburbs of Torrensville and Thebarton have a significant Greek Australian population, with 4,471 Greek Australians living in the area, that is 18.7 per cent of the total population, according to census data released by the Australian Bureau of Statistics in 2001.

Church Services
Sunday services begin at 8:00 a.m. and end at approximately 11:00 a.m. Weekday services are held on major feast days between 8:00 a.m. and 9:30 a.m.

Holy Week Services are especially solemn and are the highlight of the Orthodox Church calendar.

The Good Friday evening service, which is officiated by the Assistant Bishop to Archbishop Nikandros of Dorylaeon, includes an anticlockwise procession on the streets with an epitaph being carried from the church at approximately 9:30 p.m. Police accompany the clergy and crowd for the entire procession, and close down the southbound lanes of South Road while the crowds walk behind the clergy and the epitaph.

On Holy Saturday evening, the midnight office begins at 11:00 p.m. At midnight the priest lights the trikeria (three candles) and invites the people to "Come, receive the Light from the light that is never overtaken by night". The people rush to be first to receive the flame in order to pass it on until the entire crowd (inside and outside) have their candles lit from the holy flame. This is followed by the priest going outside on to a temporary stage to read the Paschal gospel and the traditional Paschal hymn "Χριστός Ανέστη". The Paschal Sunday service continues until approximately 2:30 a.m.

School services are held four times a year, where all students and teachers from St. George College attend a liturgy for communion. As the number of students at the college exceed the seated capacity of the church, the school now holds separate liturgies for the school. One for the primary students and one for the high-school students.

Publications
The Community and Parish publishes a quarterly magazine, "St. George Community News".

Attendance
Sunday morning service attendance is approximately 300 - 500, which is the approximate capacity of the church. Celebrations such as the feast day of St. George usually have over 1000 people attending, and the outdoor sound system is turned on for the benefit of the hundreds outside. By far, the Good Friday evening service and the midnight Easter service have the greatest attendance of the year, with upwards of 5000 having attended in the past.

People who serve in the church

Father Diogenis Patsouris, Protopresbyter of the Ecumenical Throne OAM was appointed parish priest of Saint George in 1970. Father Konstantinos Skoumbourdis was appointed assistant priest on 1 August 2012. The Head Chanter at the church was Ilias Frangoulis, Archon Protopsaltis of the Greek Orthodox Archdiocese of Australia  until his retirement on 26 October 2011; he was succeeded by John Saredakis. The Left Chanter is John Archontoulis. The chanters and assistant chanters form the choir, which chants every Sunday at St George Church.

Gallery

External links 

 Official website

Footnotes

Churches in Adelaide
Greek Orthodox churches in Australia
Greek-Australian culture